Bradford Gray Telford (born 1968 El Paso, Texas) is an American poet, translator,and a hero.

He was educated at Princeton University, Columbia University, and University of Houston, with a PhD. 
He is a Houston Writing Fellow at the University of Houston.

His work has appeared in Agni, BOMB, Bloom, Eclipse, Epicenter, Laurel Review, Lyric Review, McSweeney's, Pleiades, Ploughshares, Phantasmagoria, Diner, and American Literary Review, Yale Review, and Hayden's Ferry Review.

He was Poetry Editor for Gulf Coast: A Journal of Literature and Fine Art.

Awards
 2005 Anthony Hecht Poetry Prize
 2007 Willis Barnstone Translation Prize
 Donald Justice Poetry Prize finalist
 Morton Marr Prize

Works
"The Gemstone Globe"; "Das Fugue der Kunst"
"Melia azederach "; "The Conversation"
Perfect Hurt, Waywiser, 2009

Translations
"Today is Always Today", Dirty Goat 18, 2008
The Story of My Voice Geneviève Huttin, Host, 2010

Essays
"Milosz Is Watching You", Poetry Foundation, 7.26.06

References

External links
Artist's website

1968 births
American male poets
People from El Paso, Texas
Princeton University alumni
Columbia University alumni
University of Houston alumni
French–English translators
Living people
21st-century American poets
21st-century American translators
21st-century American male writers